Kunwar Kirti Vardhan Singh (born 1 March 1966) is an Indian politician for the Gonda (Lok Sabha constituency) in Uttar Pradesh. He is sometimes known by the alias Raja Bhaiya, being connected with erstwhile Taluqdari of Mankapur.

He was member of 12th and 14th Lok Sabha from Gonda, Uttar Pradesh as Samajwadi Party candidate. In March 2014 he resigned and joined BJP and contested the 2014 Lok Sabh seat from Gonda. Kirti Vardhan Singh is known to be an environmental activist, in July 2018, he has won a case against State government of Uttar Pradesh in Green Tribunal, a case pertaining to illegal sand mining by mafias in his constituency.

Early life and education

Kunwar Kirti Vardhan Singh was born in Lucknow on 1 March 1966 to Raja Anand Singh and Rani Veena Singh of Mankapur. His educational qualifications include M.Sc. (Geology) and he received his education from Lucknow University. He is married to Kunwarani Madhushree Singh on 16 November 2002. He has 1 son born in November 2006 currently 15 years old.( Bhanwar Jai Vardhan Singh)

References

External links
 Official biographical sketch in Parliament of India website

1966 births
Living people
People from Gonda, Uttar Pradesh
India MPs 2004–2009
Politicians from Lucknow
Lok Sabha members from Uttar Pradesh
India MPs 1998–1999
India MPs 2014–2019
Bharatiya Janata Party politicians from Uttar Pradesh
India MPs 2019–present